Evciler is a town and district of Afyonkarahisar Province, Turkey.

Evciler may also refer to the following places in Turkey:

 Evciler, Anamur, a village in Anamur district of Mersin Province
 Evciler, Bala, a village in Bala district of Ankara Province
 Evciler, Bayramiç
 Evciler, Çine, a village in Çine district of Aydın Province
 Evciler, Gölhisar a village in Gölhisar district of Burdur Province
 Evciler, İvrindi, a village
 Evciler, Mudanya

Turkish toponyms